The tribe Psoraleeae is one of the subdivisions of the plant family Fabaceae. Recent phylogenetics has this tribe nested within tribe Phaseoleae.

Genera 
Psoraleeae comprises the following genera:
 Bituminaria Heist. ex Fabr.
 Cullen Medik.
 Hoita Rydb.
 Ladeania A. N. Egan & Reveal
 Orbexilum Raf.
 Otholobium C. H. Stirt.
 Pediomelum Rydb.
 Psoralea L.
 Psoralidium Rydb.
 Rupertia J. W. Grimes

Systematics
Modern molecular phylogenetics suggest the following relationships:

References

Further reading

External links 
 
 

 
Fabaceae tribes